The Money Changers is a 1920 American silent drama film directed by Jack Conway and starring Robert McKim, Claire Adams, and Roy Stewart. It is based on a 1908 novel by Upton Sinclair.

Cast
 Robert McKim as Hugh Gordon 
 Claire Adams as Lucy Hegan 
 Roy Stewart as Allan Martin 
 Audrey Chapman as Mary Holmes 
 George Webb as Monk Mullen 
 Betty Brice as Maggie O'Brien 
 Edward Peil Sr. as Ling Choo Fong 
 Harvey Clark as Chow Chin 
 Harry Tenbrook as Chink Murphy 
 Stanton Heck as George Conley 
 Zack Williams as Wesley Shiloh Mainwaring 
 George Hernandez as James Hegan 
 Gertrude Claire as Mrs. Mullen 
 Laddie Earle as Jimmy Mullen

Reception
The film industry created the National Association of the Motion Picture Industry (NAMPI) in 1916 in an effort to preempt censorship by states and municipalities, and it used a list of subjects called the "Thirteen Points" which film plots were to avoid. The Money Changers, with its white slavery plot line, is an example of a film that clearly violated the Thirteen Points and yet was still distributed. Since the NAMPI was ineffective, it was replaced in 1922.

References

Bibliography
 James Robert Parish & Michael R. Pitts. Film Directors: a Guide to their American Films. Scarecrow Press, 1974.

External links

1920 films
1920 drama films
1920s English-language films
American silent feature films
Silent American drama films
Films based on works by Upton Sinclair
Films directed by Jack Conway
American black-and-white films
Pathé Exchange films
1920s American films